Emily Wilson (born May 28, 1985, in Westminster, Colorado) is an American actress.

Career
Wilson began her acting career in 2005 in the TV series NCIS ("SWAK"). In 2006, she was the Audition Revealed - Winner on KTLA Morning News.  In 2007, Wilson guest starred on MADtv, Californication, and Side Order of Life.

Wilson was in Meet the Spartans (2008) and The House Bunny (2008). In 2009, she guest starred on Secret Girlfriend. In 2010, Wilson was in the independent film The Boys and Girls Guide to Getting Down and  L.A. Vampire. She also guest starred on Entourage and How I Met Your Mother in 2010. Wilson then guest starred on Pair of Kings, CSI: NY, Nick Swardson's Pretend Time, Bones, The Newsroom and Hello Ladies.

General Hospital
In 2012, Wilson was cast in the ABC's General Hospital as Ellie Trout. She first appeared on September 14, 2012. The anticipated airdate was confused by some with that of Teresa Castillo's role as Sabrina Santiago, who then appeared September 19. A representative of the show later confirmed that Wilson had joined the cast on a recurring basis. On December 12, 2013, it was announced that Wilson, as well as Bradford Anderson, would exit the series. Wilson (Trout) came back in 2014 and 2015.

Personal life
In April 2015, Wilson announced her engagement to Adhir Kalyan, of Rules of Engagement. She and Kalyan married on October 1, 2016, in Palm Springs, California.

Filmography

Film

Television

References

External links

1985 births
Living people
People from Westminster, Colorado
Actresses from Colorado
American soap opera actresses
21st-century American actresses